Marc Bernhard (born 5 February 1972) is a German politician for the Alternative for Germany (AfD), and since 2017 member of the Bundestag, the federal legislative body.

Life and politics

Bernhard was born 1972 in the west German town of Reutlingen and studied jurisprudence at the University of Augsburg and became lawyer. He worked as CEO of an IT-company in Karlsruhe. 

Bernhard was member of the centre-right Christian Democratic Union of Germany before he entered the than newly founded AfD in 2013.

Since 2017 he is member of the Bundestag.

Bernhard denies the scientific consensus on climate change.

See also
EIKE

References

Living people
1972 births
Christian Democratic Union of Germany politicians
University of Augsburg alumni
Jurists from Baden-Württemberg
People from Reutlingen
Members of the Bundestag 2021–2025
Members of the Bundestag 2017–2021
Members of the Bundestag for the Alternative for Germany